Ndubuisi Godwin Ezeh (born May 10, 1984 in Nigeria) is a Nigerian football striker currently playing for Ismaily in the Egyptian Premier League.

Career
Ezeh played an important role in Al-Hilal's successful run in the CAF Champions League 2007. He signed on 4 September 2010 a professional contract with Yverdon-Sport FC in Switzerland, here played only two games in the Swiss Challenge League and joined in January 2010 to Ismaily.

References

1984 births
Living people
Igbo sportspeople
Nigerian footballers
Expatriate footballers in Libya
Association football forwards
Nigerian expatriates in Libya
Nigerian expatriate sportspeople in Saudi Arabia
Al-Hilal Club (Omdurman) players
Al-Ahli Saudi FC players
Al-Nasr SC (Benghazi) players
Saudi Professional League players
UAE Pro League players
Expatriate footballers in Saudi Arabia
Libyan Premier League players